William Covington may refer to:
 William Wallace Covington, professor of ecology
 William Jacob Covington, district court clerk of Camp County, Texas
 Bucky Covington (William Joel Covington III), American country music singer
 Tex Covington (William Wilkes Covington), pitcher in Major League Baseball